Yalta is an urban-type settlement in Mariupol Raion of Donetsk Oblast, Ukraine. It was founded by Ukrainian Greeks, whose settlement in Southern Ukraine was sanctioned by Empress Catherine the Great, and is named after Yalta in Crimea. Population: 

During the 2022 Russian Invasion of Ukraine as part of the Russo-Ukrainian War, Yalta was invaded and occupied by Russian forces.

People from Yalta 
 Viktor Chornyi (born 1968), Ukrainian politician 
 Ivan Karabyts (1945–2002), Ukrainian composer and conductor

References

Urban-type settlements in Mariupol Raion